Podgorny is a rural locality (a settlement) in Timiryazevskoye Rural Settlement of Maykopsky District, Russia. The population was 117 as of 2018. There is 1 street.

Geography 
Podgorny is located 8 km south of Tulsky (the district's administrative centre) by road. Shuntuk is the nearest rural locality.

References 

Rural localities in Maykopsky District